Too Hard to Handle is a 2016 German comedy film directed by Laura Lackmann.

Cast 
 Claudia Eisinger - Karo
 Katja Riemann - Luzy
 Barbara Schöne - Oma Bille
 Laura Tonke - Anna
  - Max
 Maren Kroymann - Annette
 Christoph Letkowski - Philipp
 Detlev Buck: Karo's Father

References

External links 

2016 comedy films
German comedy films
Films based on German novels
2010s German films